Kang Jin-Hyok (born 1 January 1985) is a North Korean international football player. He plays as a striker. Kang has played for Rimyongsu Sports Club since 2004.

Goals for Senior National Team

References

External links

1985 births
Living people
North Korean footballers
North Korea international footballers
Rimyongsu Sports Club players
Association football forwards